Alojzy is a given name. Notable people with the name include:

Alojzy Ehrlich (1914–1992), also called "King of the Chiselers," Polish table tennis legend
Alojzy Feliński (1771–1820), Polish writer
Alojzy Gonzaga Jazon Żółkowski, Ziółkowski (1814–1889), Polish actor and singer, one of the most prominent Polish comedians
Alojzy Lysko (born 1942), Polish politician
Alojzy Wir-Konas (1894–1940), Polish military commander and a Colonel of the Polish Army
Andrzej Alojzy Ankwicz (1777–1838), the Roman Catholic archbishop of Prague from 1833 to 1838
Fortunat Alojzy Gonzaga Żółkowski, Ziółkowski (1777–1822), Polish actor, comedist, adaptor, translator, and editor of humour magazines

Polish masculine given names